John MacDonald (born 9 December 1965) is a New Zealand sprint canoeist who competed in the late 1980s and early 1990s. He was eliminated in the semifinals of the K-4 1000 m event at the 1988 Summer Olympics in Seoul. Four years later in Barcelona, he was eliminated in the semifinals of both the K-1 500 m and K-1 1000 m events.

References
Sports-reference.com profile

1965 births
Canoeists at the 1988 Summer Olympics
Canoeists at the 1992 Summer Olympics
Living people
New Zealand male canoeists
Olympic canoeists of New Zealand